Niuava Eti Malolo is a Samoan politician and Member of the Legislative Assembly of Samoa. He is a member of the FAST Party.

Niuava is from Vaisala in the Vaisigano district. He worked for more than two decades as a school principal before becoming a public servant for the Ministry of Natural Resources and Environment. He was first elected to the Legislative Assembly of Samoa in the 2021 Samoan general election, defeating Minister of Agriculture and Fisheries Lopao'o Natanielu Mua. An electoral petition against him by Lopao'o was dismissed. On 28 July 2021 he was appointed Associate Minister of Works Transport and Infrastructure.

References

Living people
Members of the Legislative Assembly of Samoa
Faʻatuatua i le Atua Samoa ua Tasi politicians
Samoan civil servants
Samoan educators
People from Vaisigano
Year of birth missing (living people)